Wang Hun may refer to:

Wang Hun (general) (223–297), general serving the Cao Wei and Jin dynasties
Sunjong of Goryeo (1047–1083), personal name Wang Hun, Goryeo king
Grand Prince Yeondeok (died  1346), Goryeo royalty